MNS may refer to:
Maharashtra Navnirman Sena, Indian political party
The Malaysian Nature Society
Maki-Nakagawa-Sakata matrix in particle physics
Ministry of National Security of several countries
Minneapolis, Northfield and Southern Railway, reporting mark
Mirror neuron system
Mission Need Statement
MNS antigen system, a variant blood group
Monday Night Soccer, an Irish television programme
Movement for a New Society
National Syndicalists (Portugal), Movimento Nacional-Sindicalista
Manganese(II) sulfide, chemical symbol MnS
Mansi language, by ISO 639-3 language code